Hamuera Tamahau Mahupuku (c.1842 – 14 January 1904) was a New Zealand tribal leader, runholder, assessor and newspaper proprietor. Of Māori descent, he identified with the Ngāti Kahungunu iwi. He was born in the Wairarapa, New Zealand (either at Rangataua, near Longbush, or at Pahaoamy) in c.1842.

References

1840s births
1904 deaths
New Zealand farmers
New Zealand writers
Ngāti Kahungunu people
New Zealand Māori writers
New Zealand editors
New Zealand magazine editors